Nguyễn Ðăng Bình (born 3 February 1956) is a Vietnamese swimmer. He competed in the men's 100 metre butterfly at the 1980 Summer Olympics.

References

1956 births
Living people
Vietnamese male swimmers
Olympic swimmers of Vietnam
Swimmers at the 1980 Summer Olympics
Place of birth missing (living people)
Male butterfly swimmers